The Brown-Daly-Horne House is a historic house in Pulaski, Tennessee, U.S..

History
The house was built in 1855 for Sarah Jane Roberts. It was purchased by John C. Brown in 1869, and it caught fire in 1871. Two years later, in 1873, it was purchased by Carson T. Mason.  It was subsequently purchased by T. E. Daly.

The house has been listed on the National Register of Historic Places since December 6, 1979.

References

Houses on the National Register of Historic Places in Tennessee
Queen Anne architecture in Tennessee
Houses completed in 1855
Houses in Giles County, Tennessee